Turris crispa is a species of sea snail, a marine gastropod mollusk in the family Turridae, the turrids.

The subspecies Turris crispa intricata Powell, 1964 is a synonym of Turris intricata Powell, 1964 (original combination)

Description
The size of an adult shell varies between 60 mm and 170 mm.

Distribution
This marine species occurs off Madagascar, Australia, Japan, the Philippines and the Fiji Islands.

References

 Lamarck J.B. (1816). Liste des objets représentés dans les planches de cette livraison. In: Tableau encyclopédique et méthodique des trois règnes de la Nature. Mollusques et Polypes divers. Agasse, Paris. 16 pp.
 Hedley, C. 1922. A revision of the Australian Turridae. Records of the Australian Museum 13(6): 213–359, pls 42–56 [
 Powell, A.W.B. 1966. The molluscan families Speightiidae and Turridae, an evaluation of the valid taxa, both Recent and fossil, with list of characteristic species. Bulletin of the Auckland Institute and Museum. Auckland, New Zealand 5: 1–184, pls 1–23
 Wilson, B. 1994. Australian marine shells. Prosobranch gastropods. Kallaroo, WA : Odyssey Publishing Vol. 2 370 pp. 
 Olivera, B. M. (2000). The subfamily Turrinae in the Philippines: The genus Turris (Röding, 1798). Philippine Journal of Science. 128(4), 295–318
 Kilburn R.N., Fedosov A.E. & Olivera B.M. (2012) Revision of the genus Turris Batsch, 1789 (Gastropoda: Conoidea: Turridae) with the description of six new species. Zootaxa 3244: 1-58
 Steyn, D. G.; Lussi, M. (2005). Offshore Shells of Southern Africa: A pictorial guide to more than 750 Gastropods. Published by the authors. pp. i–vi, 1–289.
 Liu, J.Y. [Ruiyu] (ed.). (2008). Checklist of marine biota of China seas. China Science Press. 1267 pp

External links
 *  Tucker, J.K. 2004 Catalog of recent and fossil turrids (Mollusca: Gastropoda). Zootaxa 682:1-1295.
 

crispa
Gastropods described in 1816